The Stanford Championships was an event in the Outback Champions Series for senior tennis players. It began in 2006 in Memphis, Tennessee, but relocated to Dallas, Texas in 2007. It is sponsored by the Stanford Financial Group.

Finals results

2006 establishments in Tennessee
Tennis tournaments in the United States
Champions Series (senior men's tennis tour)
Sports in Memphis, Tennessee
Sports competitions in Dallas
Tennis in Tennessee
Recurring sporting events established in 2006
2008 disestablishments in Tennessee
Tennis in Texas